The Larwood Bridge is a covered bridge near Lacomb in Linn County in the U.S. state of Oregon. It was added to the National Register of Historic Places in 1979.

The  bridge carries Fish Hatchery Road over the creek.

Built in 1939, the bridge was repaired in 2002. It was named after William Larwood, who settled here in 1888, built a store and blacksmith shop, and operated a post office. The bridge had two predecessors, one over the creek and another over the river, adjacent to one another. Both no longer exist.

See also
List of bridges documented by the Historic American Engineering Record in Oregon
List of bridges on the National Register of Historic Places in Oregon
List of Oregon covered bridges

References

External links

Bridges completed in 1939
Covered bridges on the National Register of Historic Places in Oregon
Bridges in Linn County, Oregon
Wooden bridges in Oregon
Tourist attractions in Linn County, Oregon
Historic American Engineering Record in Oregon
National Register of Historic Places in Linn County, Oregon
Road bridges on the National Register of Historic Places in Oregon
Howe truss bridges in the United States